James Genth (1849 - 1926) was a rugby union international who represented England from 1874 to 1875.

Early life

Born Jacob Scherer Genth on July 17, 1849, in Ardwick, Manchester, he was the fifth of at least seven children of Carl Georg Ferdinand Genth and Maria Louise nee Scherer. Both his mother and father were originally from Hessen-Nassau and Jacob was baptised there in Frankfurt.His father, known as Ferdinand, had arrived in England in 1842, the year after marrying Maria. Ferdinand traded as a Shipping Merchant operating out of Lancashire. Although christened Jacob, his family were to refer to him as James by the time he was 11. By the age of 21, James was working as a commercial clerk in his father's firm.

Rugby union career

James Genth grew up in Fallowfield, Lancashire, now a suburb of Manchester. As such, he played his club rugby for Manchester.  Genth made his winning international debut on February 23, 1874, at The Oval in the fourth meeting of England and Scotland. He again represented England against Scotland the following year in Edinburgh where the match was drawn.

Career and later life
James was a keen sportsman and aside from rugby also played lacrosse, at one point represented the North in the North vs South match held at the Kennington Oval on 7th April 1877. He was a keen golfer as well. James Genth continued within his father's business and became a Shipping Merchant, residing in the family home in Burnage, Lancashire. By 1901 he had retired but still travelled extensively, describing himself as a gentleman. James had moved to London by 1921 and from 1921 was married to Rose Ellen. He died on 2 April 1926.

References

1849 births
1926 deaths
English rugby union players
England international rugby union players
Rugby union forwards
Manchester Rugby Club players